Givira obidosa is a moth in the family Cossidae. It is found in Brazil (Pará).

References

Natural History Museum Lepidoptera generic names catalog

Givira
Moths described in 1923